The Netherlands was represented by Marcha (Marga Bult), with the song "Rechtop in de wind", at the 1987 Eurovision Song Contest, which took place in Brussels on 9 April. The song was the winner of the Dutch national final for the contest, held on 25 March.

Before Eurovision

Nationaal Songfestival 1987 
The national final was held at the Koninklijk Conservatorium in The Hague, hosted by Astrid Joosten. Six songs, all performed by Marcha, took part, with the winner being decided by juries in the twelve Dutch provinces, who each awarded a minimum of 5 points and a maximum of 30 points per song. "Rechtop in de wind" emerged an easy victor, the outright choice of nine of the juries, with a winning points margin of almost twice the number separating the other five songs.

At Eurovision 
On the night of the final Marcha performed 12th in the running order, following Greece and preceding Luxembourg. Her performance is remembered by Eurovision fans as much for her classic 1980s Dynasty-style appearance (complete with huge shoulder pads and big hair) as for the song itself. At the close of voting "Rechtop in de wind" had received 83 points from 14 countries, placing the Netherlands 5th of the 22 entries, their first top 5 finish since 1980. The Dutch jury awarded its 12 points to Ireland.

The Dutch conductor at the contest was Rogier van Otterloo for the fifth and last time, only a few months before his death in January 1988.

The members of the Dutch jury included Ruud van den Bosch, Rixt Hilverda, Chantal Keijzer, Mylène Höhle, Fred Jonker, Simone Albers, John van Suijlekom, Ton Snijders, Arend van de Werf, René Pauli, and Ditta de Vroed.

Voting

References

External links 
 Dutch Preselection 1987

1987
Countries in the Eurovision Song Contest 1987
Eurovision